Maximiliano Andrada (born 5 October 1985) is a retired Argentine football defender.

References

External links
 

1985 births
Living people
Sportspeople from Rosario, Santa Fe
Argentine footballers
Nacional Potosí players
C.D. Jorge Wilstermann players
Club San José players
Club Real Potosí players
Sport Boys Warnes players
Club Atlético Ciclón players
Bolivian Primera División players
Association football defenders
Argentine expatriate footballers
Expatriate footballers in Bolivia
Argentine expatriate sportspeople in Bolivia